Purushotthama is a 1992 Indian Kannada-language romance drama film directed by M. S. Rajashekar and produced by Madhu Bangarappa. The film stars Shiva Rajkumar, Shivaranjini and Ranjitha (credited as Madhubala).

Cast 

 Shiva Rajkumar as Paramashiva a.k.a shivu
 Shivarajini
 Ranjitha (credited as Madhubala)
 Srinath
 Balakrishna
 Mukhyamantri Chandru
 Thoogudeepa Srinivas
 Vajramuni
 Ashok
 Prithviraj
 Sudheer

Soundtrack 
The soundtrack of the film was composed by Hamsalekha.All songs were hit

References 

1992 films
1990s Kannada-language films
Indian romantic drama films
Films directed by M. S. Rajashekar
Films scored by Hamsalekha
1992 romantic drama films